Shlomo "Shlomi" Hanuka (born 15 August 1985) is an Israeli association football.. He previously played for Maccabi Ahi Nazareth, Hapoel Petah Tikva and Hapoel Acre, Hapoel Afula.

References

1985 births
Living people
Israeli Jews
Israeli footballers
Maccabi Haifa F.C. players
Hapoel Acre F.C. players
Hapoel Nof HaGalil F.C. players
Maccabi Ahi Nazareth F.C. players
Hapoel Herzliya F.C. players
Maccabi Ironi Bat Yam F.C. players
Hapoel Afula F.C. players
Hapoel Petah Tikva F.C. players
Hapoel Migdal HaEmek F.C. players
Hapoel Iksal F.C. players
Liga Leumit players
Israeli Premier League players
Footballers from Haifa
Association football midfielders